Machrouu Tounes is a big tent secularist Tunisian political party founded on 20 March 2016 by Mohsen Marzouk as a breakaway from Nidaa Tounes, the then ruling party. It includes members of the centre-left and centre-right, as well as nationalists.

References

2016 establishments in Tunisia
Destourian parties
Political parties established in 2016
Political parties in Tunisia
Secularism in Tunisia